Lee Township is one of sixteen townships in Franklin County, Iowa, United States.  As of the 2010 census, its population was 179 and it contained 80 housing units.

History
Lee Township was created in 1870. First called Iowa Township, it was soon renamed in honor of William H. Lee, a pioneer settler.

Geography

Unincorporated towns
 Burdette at 
(This list is based on USGS data and may include former settlements.)

School districts
 Alden Community School District
 Dows Community School District
 Hampton-Dumont Community School District
 Iowa Falls Community School District

Political districts
 Iowa's 4th congressional district
 State House District 54
 State Senate District 27

References

External links
 City-Data.com

Townships in Iowa
Townships in Franklin County, Iowa
Populated places established in 1870
1870 establishments in Iowa